Hickory Grove Township is a township in Jasper County, Iowa, USA.

History
Independence Township was established in 1864.

References

Townships in Jasper County, Iowa
Townships in Iowa
1864 establishments in Iowa
Populated places established in 1864